"One More Time" is a song by the Swedish heavy and power metal band HammerFall released as a single to promote their album Infected. There are two versions that were released – the first one on 6 April 2011 which is only available as a digital download. It features a live recording of "Hallowed Be My Name" and an instrumental version of the single title track. On 8 April a second version was released which featured "Lore of the Arcane/Trailblazers" live and a newly recorded version of "Blood Bound". It was written by vocalist Joacim Cans and guitarist Oscar Dronjak and it is the only HammerFall song in drop C tuning.

Music video
A music video was recorded for the song "One More Time" and was directed by Swedish director Patrick Ullaeus. Along with the album it deals with a zombie infection. It features a storyline with the band performing in a studio when they are attacked by zombies, who were played by fans of HammerFall. The band tries to fight them and later on they manage to escape. At the end it says "To be Continued" which implies that the story is not over.

Track listing

Digital single

CD, maxi single

Comes as a free bonus CD to the subscribers of Sweden Rock Magazine issue #81, April 2011.

Personnel
 Joacim Cans - lead and backing vocals
 Oscar Dronjak - guitar and backing vocals
 Pontus Norgren - lead guitar
 Fredrik Larsson - bass
 Anders Johansson - drums

7" EP vinyl release
On 8 April 2011, Nuclear Blast Records released a limited edition picture 7-inch EP version of the HammerFall single "One More Time" from their studio album Infected. The vinyl is limited to 500 copies and sold through the Nuclear Blast Mailorder only. The A-side contains "One More Time" and the B-side contains a live version of "Hallowed Be My Name" – recorded at the Scandinavium in Gothenburg on 27 March 2009.

References

External links
Official HammerFall website
Single information

2011 singles
HammerFall songs
Nuclear Blast Records singles
2011 songs
Songs written by Oscar Dronjak
Songs written by Joacim Cans